The Kuwait Trade Union Federation (KTUF) is the sole national trade union center in Kuwait. It was founded in 1968.

The Kuwait Trade Union Federation is affiliated with the International Trade Union Confederation (ITUC) affiliate,.

There are 38 trade unions in Kuwait, of which 15 are formally members of the KTUF.

Legal context 

The freedoms of association and collective bargaining in Kuwait are recognized by law; however, they are strictly regulated. For instance, Article 104 of the Labour Act "prohibits unions from interfering in political, religious, and sectarian issues".

Under Kuwaiti law, the Kuwait Trade Union Federation is the only federation of trade unions permitted to exist on a national level, although the government permits limited trade union pluralism at the local level.  However, despite these restrictions, some unions outside of the KTUF exist, which include the Kuwait Bank Workers’ Union and the Kuwait Airways Workers’ Union.

References

Trade unions in Kuwait
World Federation of Trade Unions
International Confederation of Arab Trade Unions
Economy of the Arab League
Trade unions established in 1968
1968 establishments in Kuwait